Transport in Ernakulam district consists of various modes.

Transport Sections
There are 9 Regional Transport Offices.

 Ernakulam – KL 07
 Muvattupuzha – KL 17
 Thripunithura – KL 39
 Perumbavoor – KL 40
 Aluva – KL 41
 North Paravur – KL 42
 Mattancherry – KL 43
 Kothamangalam – KL 44
 Angamaly – KL 63

The district has got the maximum number of vehicles in the state.

Road connectivity
Ernakulam district has excellent road connectivity. The three major national highways passing through Ernakulam District are the Cochin-Mumbai Highway (NH 66), Salem-Kanyakumari (NH 47 part of NSEW corridor) and Cochin-Dhanushkodi highway (NH 49).

North South Corridor
The North South Corridor highway system starting from Edapally in Cochin on NH47 and connects the cities Thrissur, Palakkad, Coimbatore, Salem and finally to Chennai . The National Highway 66 starting from Kanyakumari and rest of the country towards north Nagercoil, Trivandrum, Kollam, Alapuzha and towards Edapally and connects the cities Guruvayur, Calicut, Kannur, Kasaragod, Mangalore, Goa and Mumbai. The National Highway 49, also known as Madurai Highway starts from Kundannur near Cochin and passes through Muvattupuzha, Kothamangalam, Munnar, Theni, Madurai and finally terminates at Dhanushkodi. The district also has the two small national highways namely NH 47A for Cochin Port connectivity (Smallest Indian National Highway) starting from Kundannur and NH 47C as part of the International Container Transshipment Terminal connectivity starting from Kalamassery.

Major highways
The district is also well connected by state highways and other roads. Important state highway SH 1 also known as Main Central Road starts from Angamaly, a suburb of Kochi city which connects to the state capital Trivandrum via Perumbavoor, Muvattupuzha, Koothattukulam.

 Seaport – Airport road via Kakkanad
 Palarivattom – Moovattupuzha – Punalur SH:- Connects Kakkanad, Pallikkara, Kizhakkambalam, Pattimattom, Moovattupuzha, Vazhakulam, Thodupuzha, Pathanamthitta
 North Paravur – Aluva – Munnar SH:- Connects Alengad, Perumbavoor, Kothamangalam
Vypin- Munambam SH:- Connects Vypin, Njarackal, Cherai, Munambam
Thrippunithura – Sabarimalai:-Connects Mulamthuruthy, Piravom, Pala, Erumely
Vytilla- Kottayam road:- Connects via Thripoonithura, Nadakkavu, Poothotta, Vaikkom, Kumarakom
Fort Kochi – Alappuzha road
 Angamaly – Athirappilly road via Mookkanur
 Perumbavoor – Puthencruz road

Railway system
Ernakulam district has 17 railway stations. The Ernakulam Junction and Ernakulam Town and Aluva are the major ones. The other stations are Angamaly, Thripunithura, Edapally, Mulamthuruthy, Cochin Harbour Terminus, Karakutty, Chowara, Kalamassery, Nettoor, Kumbalam, Mattancherry H., Chottanikkara road and Piravom road. The railroutes are via Thrissur, Kottayam, Cochin H.T., Allapuzha and Vallarpadam. The Angamaly-Erumely Sabarimala route passes through the district.

Kochi Metro urban rail system is proposed in the city.

Air transport
Ernakulam district has two airports, Naval airport in W. island (Old Cochin airport) and Cochin International Airport (CIAL). CIAL is the fourth largest airport in the country after Mumbai, Delhi and Chennai having International passengers. Currently flights are operating to the Persian Gulf region, Malaysia, Singapore, Sri Lanka and to major cities in India.

Waterways
Ernakulam district lies in the flat delta region of the Periyar and Moovattupuzha rivers. Water transport is prominent in the district through rivers and lagoons. The major boat services are in Ernakulam area and other areas having small ferry services. The district boasts of having the largest port in the west coast of the country: the Cochin port, which is also the reason for large scale developments in the district. Now a new International port is completed in Vallarpadam which will boost the developments in the district further.

References

Transport in Ernakulam district